Ruslan Mikhailovich Lyashchuk (born 21 November 1974) is a former Russian football player.

Honours
Pyunik
Armenian Premier League champion: 2002
Armenian Independence Cup winner: 2002

References

1974 births
Living people
Soviet footballers
FC Rostov players
FC APK Morozovsk players
Russian footballers
FC Chernomorets Novorossiysk players
Russian Premier League players
Armenian Premier League players
FC SKA Rostov-on-Don players
FC Moscow players
FC Zvezda Irkutsk players
FC Pyunik players
Russian expatriate footballers
Expatriate footballers in Armenia
Association football goalkeepers
FC Tyumen players